Mehmed Shevki Efendi (Modern Turkish: Mehmed Şevki Efendi; 1829 Kastamonu–1887 Istanbul) was a prominent Ottoman calligrapher. He is known for his Thuluth-Naskh works, and his style developed into the Shevki Mektebi school, which many contemporary calligraphers in the style take as a reference.

Life and career
Born in Kastamonu, a town near the Black Sea, in 1829, Mehmed Shevki Efendi was the son of Ahmad Agha from Tajc. He was sent to Istanbul at a young age, where he was raised by his uncle.  

He received his earliest formal training from his uncle, Mehmed Hulûsi Efendi (d. 1894) and obtained a Diploma at the age of fourteen. He was trained in the thuluth and the naskh scripts. Later, his uncle wanted him to study with a more experienced master, and sought to apprentice him to Kazasker Mustafa Izzet Efendi. However, the boy refused to study with any master, other than his uncle. Ultimately, he taught himself advanced techniques from calligraphic works of Hâfiz Osman and other great calligraphers. By remaining with his uncle, rather than joining a different school, Mehmed Şevkî had the freedom to develop his own style. This style became known as û Şevki mektebi eb. He certified a number of calligraphers, who went on to enjoy exceptional careers including Mohammad Hosni.

Şevkî Efendi was the last in a long line of calligraphers, beginning with Seyh Hamdullah in the 15th century, who refined and improved the sülüs and naskh scripts. He achieved a "height of perfection never attained previously, nor surpassed since."  

He taught penmanship in the Ministry of War, where he trained military scribes and also worked in several schools. He also taught calligraphy to the sons of Sultan Abdulhamid II.  

He died on 7 May, 1887 following a stroke and was buried next to his uncle, Hulûsi Efendi, in the Merkezefendi Cemetery. He was survived by three daughters and a son.

Work
He wrote 25 copies of the Q'ran and also produced many personal prayer books. He is the author of the work, The Thuluth & Naskh Mashqs.  His work also includes calligraphic compositions, which he signed "Muhammed Shawki".

See also
Culture of the Ottoman Empire
Islamic calligraphy
List of Ottoman calligraphers
Ottoman art

References

Ottoman culture
Calligraphers from the Ottoman Empire
1829 births
1887 deaths
Muslim artists
19th-century artists from the Ottoman Empire